Rescue 911 is a pinball machine designed by Bill Parker and released by Gottlieb in 1994. The game is based on the TV show of the same name.

Description
The gameplay features some disaster rescue scenarios e.g. saving people from wildfires and flash floods and emergency medical missions such as delivering a parturient mother to a nearby hospital.

The playfield most notably includes a magnetic helicopter toy that can lift the ball from the ground. The wizard mode starts a light and sound show including an EKG heartbeat sound similar to the metamorphosis effects on Bride of Pinbot. The game does not have images or the voice of Rescue 911 TV show host William Shatner because Gottlieb did not get the rights from him. A planned reference was cancelled in an advanced state of development; as a result  four stand up targets that should spell TREK are left empty.

Digital versions
Rescue 911 is available as a licensed table of The Pinball Arcade for several platforms.

References

External links
 

1994 pinball machines
Gottlieb pinball machines
Pinball machines based on television series